Cheap Street Press was an American small publishing company started up in 1980 and operated by the husband-wife duo, George and Jan O'Nale, in their rural home near New Castle, Virginia. Cheap Street concentrated on publishing limited edition books, signed and numbered, of science fiction and fantasy works. Their books were hand-printed letterpress by George on fine (often handmade) paper and hand-bound in fine cloth and leather with matching drop-back boxes.

Their books were typically issued in editions of 50 to 200 copies, and sold for up to $250 each. They approached authors who they identified for excellence in writing quality.

George and Jan O'Nale were hermitic in their habits, living in a fairly unpopulated area in the Virginian countryside. In 2002, the O'Nales donated their collection of books and press materials to Tulane University, and then committed suicide in the spring of 2003, citing increasing health problems.

A sampling of books published by Cheap Street Press:
 At the Double Solstice by Gregory Benford
 Paperjack by Charles de Lint
 Torturing Mr. Amberwell by Thomas M. Disch
 The Adventures of Cobble's Rune by Ursula K. Le Guin
 The Beautiful Biting Machine by Tanith Lee
 Ervool by Fritz Leiber
 The Girl Who Heard Dragons by Anne McCaffrey
 Red Noise by John Sladek
 Flying Saucer Rock and Roll by Howard Waldrop
 The Arimaspian Legacy by Gene Wolfe
 On Saint Hubert's Thing by Chelsea Quinn Yarbro
 A Rhapsody in Amber by Roger Zelazny

Other items published by Cheap Street Press:
 Pamphlet: The Complete Twelve Hours of the Night by "William Ashbless" (William Ashbless is actually a pen name for James P. Blaylock & Tim Powers.)

References

External links 
 Obituary article on the Science Fiction and Fantasy Writers of America website

American speculative fiction publishers
Small press publishing companies
Science fiction publishers
Book publishing companies based in Virginia
Defunct book publishing companies of the United States